Swedish Red Cross University is a Swedish university operated with the Swedish Red Cross Home Foundation as its accountable authority. It is not to be confused with The Swedish Red Cross. In addition to a degree in nursing, the institution also offers university courses related to the subject of nursing.

The Swedish Red Cross School of Nursing was established in 1867 with Emmy Reppy as its first director. The Red Cross Home Foundation (Stiftelsen Rödakorshemmet) was formed in 1915 to provide training for nurses under the auspices of the Red Cross in Sweden, and follows the principles and values of the Red Cross. The Swedish Red Cross University (former Red Cross School of Nursing) is situated at Campus Flemingsberg in Stockholm since 2016.

Degree
The Swedish Red Cross University offers a degree of Bachelor of Science in Nursing and degrees of Master of Science in intensive care, psychiatric care and infectious disease care. The programmes are run in Swedish but the University offers courses in English and an exchange student programme.

External links
 Official website for the Swedish Red Cross University College 
 Swedish Red Cross University College 

Nursing schools in Sweden
Higher education in Stockholm
Private universities and colleges in Europe